Filippo Valguarnera (born August 27, 1977) is an Italian-Swedish legal scholar dedicated mainly to the study of access to nature and access to justice. He earned his law degree and Ph.D. at the University of Florence (Italy). Filippo Valguarnera spent time as a visiting fellow at Uppsala University and New York University.  Filippo Valguarnera is currently member of the law faculty at University of Gothenburg (Sweden).
Filippo Valguarnera leads together with Ugo Mattei (University of California - Hastings) and  Saki Bailey (International University College of Turin) a research project on access to commons in the frame of the Common Core of European Private Law.

Selected writings 
2014 - Accesso alla natura tra ideologia e diritto (2nd edition) 
2008 - La tradizione giuridica dei Paesi nordici (with Alessandro Simoni)

References

External links 
 Filippo Valguarnera's page on academia.edu
 Books of Filippo Valguarnera on academia.edu
 Articles of Filippo Valguarnera on academia.edu
 Filippo Valguarnera's page on the website of the University of Gothenburg
 Filippo Valguarnera on bepress

1977 births
Living people
Italian male writers